Fabia may refer to:

 Fabia gens, an ancient Roman family
 Fabia, the daughter of Marcus Fabius Ambustus (consular tribune 381 BC)
 Fabia (given name), an Italian feminine given name derived from masculine Fabio
 Fabia Arete, Roman actress
 Fabia Eudokia, a Byzantine empress
 Fabia (crab), a genus of crab in the family Pinnotheridae
 Fabia (Latium), an ancient city in Latium
 Fabia Sheen, a fictional character from the Bakugan franchise
 Škoda Fabia, an automobile